A residual supplier is a country that supplies the world market only after importers have met their initial needs from preferred suppliers. A residual supplier is not initially competitive because of higher prices or lower quality.

References 

International trade